Steve Thibaut Ekedi Soppo (born 24 May 1991), known as Steve Ekedi, is a Cameroonian football player who plays for TORRENT CF.

Club career
He made his professional debut in the Segunda Liga for Desportivo das Aves on 8 November 2015 in a game against Famalicão and scored on his debut.

References

External links
Steve Ekedi at La Preferente
 

1991 births
Footballers from Douala
Living people
Cameroonian footballers
Liga Portugal 2 players
Campeonato de Portugal (league) players
Tercera División players
Algerian Ligue Professionnelle 1 players
Elche CF Ilicitano footballers
Cameroonian expatriate footballers
Racing de Ferrol footballers
CD Torrevieja players
C.D. Aves players
Académico de Viseu F.C. players
S.C. Freamunde players
JS Kabylie players
UD Somozas players
CD Lealtad players
Cameroonian expatriate sportspeople in Spain
Cameroonian expatriate sportspeople in Portugal
Cameroonian expatriate sportspeople in Algeria
Expatriate footballers in Spain
Expatriate footballers in Algeria
Expatriate footballers in Portugal
Association football forwards